JTIP may refer to:
Northwestern Journal of Technology and Intellectual Property
Tulane Journal of Technology and Intellectual Property